Danny Jones is a 1972 British romantic drama film directed by Jules Bricken and starring Frank Finlay, Jane Carr and Len Jones.

Plot
Danny Jones (Len Jones) is a 17-year-old young man in Wales who lives and works with his father (Frank Finlay). When their carpentry and plumbing operation takes them to a boarding school, Danny meets an 18-year-old girl there called Angie (Jane Carr). He and Angie develop feelings for each other and eventually fall in love.

The film focuses on Danny's relationship with Angie and his abusive, dominant father whom Angie convinces Danny to stand up to.

Cast
 Frank Finlay as Mr. Jones 
 Jane Carr as Angie Dickson 
 Len Jones as Danny Jones 
 Jenny Hanley as Sue 
 Nigel Humphreys as Jim Harper 
 Marianne Stone as Woman in hotel 
 Raymond Young as Mr. Dickson 
 Andria Lawrence as Ice cream girl 
 Phillip Ross as Mr. Harper

Production

Filming
The film was shot on location in North Wales and at Goldhawk Studios, Shepherd's Bush, London, England.

External links

1972 films
1972 drama films
British drama films
1970s English-language films
1970s British films